Legendary is the seventh studio album by American rapper Tyga, released on June 7, 2019, by Last Kings Records and Empire Distribution. It follows the release of his sixth album Kyoto (2018). It includes the singles "Taste" featuring Offset, "Goddamn" (featuring A Boogie wit da Hoodie on the album version), and "Haute" featuring Chris Brown and J Balvin. A deluxe version of the album was released on August 23, 2019. It features four previously released singles: "Dip" with Nicki Minaj, "Girls Have Fun" featuring G-Eazy and Rich the Kid , "Swish" and "Floss in the Bank", as well as four new songs.

Critical reception

HipHopDX gave a mixed-to-negative response towards the album, saying that "If Tyga’s goal is to be as Legendary as the title of his latest album suggests, he needs to do better. After all, he certainly knows better".

Commercial performance
On the day of the release, Legendary was certified gold by the Recording Industry Association of America (RIAA) due to a technicality which incorporates the track-equivalent units moved by the previously released single "Taste".

Legendary debuted at number 17 on the US Billboard 200 with 24,000 album-equivalent units, of which 3,000 were pure album sales. The album marks his highest-charting project since 2015's Fan of a Fan: The Album collaboration with Chris Brown.

Track listing
Credits adapted from Apple Music, Tidal and BMI.

Notes

  signifies an uncredited co-producer
 "Swish" is stylized in all caps

Credits and personnel
Credits adapted from Tidal.

Production 

 Mustard – production , co-production 
 Official – production , co-production 
 Boi-1da – production 
 Dupri – production 
 Bham – production 
 Dr. Luke – production 
 D. A. Doman – production 
 Extendo Beatz – production 
 Murda Beatz – production 
 Kaelin Capron – co-production 
 TT Audi – co-production 
 Sool Hot Hits – co-production

Technical 
 Christian "CQ" Quinonez – engineering

Charts

Certifications

References

2019 albums
Tyga albums
Empire Distribution albums
West Coast hip hop albums
Albums produced by Boi-1da
Albums produced by DJ Mustard
Albums produced by Murda Beatz